First Arsch was a German, Schwerin-based punk rock band formed in 1986 by Till Lindemann, the subsequent lead singer of German band Rammstein. In First Arsch, Lindemann played the drums.

The band would also book concerts under the name First Art due to the East German authorities.

History 
First Arsch formed in 1986 when singer-bassist Jörg Mielke and then-drummer Till Lindemann met at Lindemann's birthday party. The group played concerts around East Germany and in the early 1990s recorded their debut album, Saddle Up, released in November 1992, with Paul Landers of Feeling B and Richard Kruspe of Das Elegante Chaos as guitarists.

In 1993, Lindemann, Kruspe and Landers left First Arsch to form Rammstein and Mielke replaced them with Volker Voigt and Tom Knopf. This lineup released a new song, "Das Schlagzeug fliegt da fast außernander", in 1995.

Saddle Up 

Saddle Up is First Arsch's first and only album. It was released in November 1992. The album's art was created by Matthias Mathies, who would later work together with Rammstein frontman Till Lindemann on his book "In stillen Nächten".

On 18 December 2020, the album was remastered and reissued on vinyl, and hit No. 44 on the German charts that Christmas.

Track listing

Personnel 
Jörg E. Mielke – vocals, bass guitar
Richard Kruspe – lead guitar, vocals
Paul Landers – rhythm guitar, vocals
Till Lindemann – drums, vocals

References

External links 
First Arsch on Discogs

Further reading 

German musical groups
Musical groups established in 1984
1984 establishments in East Germany
Rammstein